= Tōru Takeuchi =

Imperial Japanese Army general

- 武内 徹
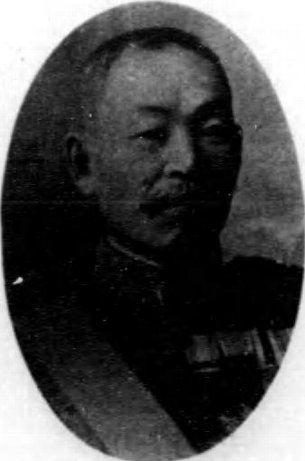
- Born: May 4, 1867
- Died: November 25, 1929 (aged 62)
- Military career
- Rank: General

Tōru Takeuchi (武内 徹, Takeuchi Tōru; May 4, 1867 – November 25, 1929) was an Imperial Japanese Army general.
